Global Trust Bank may refer to the following defunct banks:

Global Trust Bank (India)
Global Trust Bank (Uganda)